Jock Rock 2000 is the third album in the Jock Rock series of compilation albums.

Track listing
 "Let's Get It On!" – Mills Lane
 "Firestarter" – Prodigy
 "It's All about the Benjamins (Rock Remix)" – Puff Daddy featuring Lil' Kim, The LOX and The Notorious B.I.G.
 "Flagpole Sitta" – Harvey Danger
 "Semi-Charmed Life" – Third Eye Blind
 "One Week (Pull's Break Remix)" – Barenaked Ladies
 "Go, Fight, Win!" – Bleacher Creatures
 "Ready to Go (Rock version)" – Republica
 "Machinehead" – Bush
 "The Rockafeller Skank" – Fatboy Slim
 "The Bleacher Creatures" – Bleacher Creatures
 "Oh Yeah, All Right" – Local H
 "Peppyrock" – BTK
 "Put Your Hands Together!" – Bleacher Creatures
 "Block Rockin' Beats" – The Chemical Brothers
 "Zoot Suit Riot – Cherry Poppin' Daddies
 "Walk This Way" – Aerosmith featuring Run-D.M.C.
 "The Sportscenter Mega Mix" – Dan Patrick, Stuart Scott and Kenny Mayne
 "Can't Wait One More Minute" – CIV
 "Pump It Up" – Elvis Costello
 "Down for the Count" – Mills Lane

Charts

Jock series
1999 compilation albums
Dance music compilation albums
Rock compilation albums
Tommy Boy Records compilation albums